Utpalendu Chakrabarty (born 1948) is a Bengali Indian filmmaker and theater personality, based in Kolkata, India.

Life and career
He was born in Calcutta in 1948. He graduated from the Scottish Church College, of the University of Calcutta.

Chakrabarty was involved in politics in his student life and spent time in Purulia among the tribals. Although he started out as a teacher, his passion was cinema. He made several documentaries and films. He has two daughters, Chitrangada and Ritabhari Chakraborty.

Filmography

Director

Feature films
 Prasab 1994
 Chandaneer 1989
 Phaansi 1988
 Debshishu 1985
 Chokh 1983
 Maina Tadanta 1980

Television films
 Dwibachan 1989
 Sonar Chheye Dami  1989
 Rang 1989
 Bikalpa 1988
 Aparichita 1986
 Aparichita(Bengali) 2002
 Kalo Patharer Itikatha(Balad of the black Stone)
 Chua Chandan
 May Day 2005

Documentaries
 The Music of Satyajit Ray 1984
 Debrata Biswas  1983
 Mukti Chai 1977
 Sunilo Sagore(On The Life of Sunil Gangopadhyay)

Writer
 The Music of Satyajit Ray (documentary) 1984
 Chokh (screenplay / story) 1983

Composer
 Chokh 1983

Music director
 Chhaturtha Panipather Juddha 1995

Awards
Indira Gandhi Award for Best Debut Film of a Director at the 28th National Film Awards in 1980 for Maina Tadanta
National Film Award for Best Feature Film at the 30th National Film Awards in 1982 for Chokh
National Film Award for Best Direction at the 30th National Film Awards in 1982 for Chokh
Berlin International Film Festival OCIC Award in 1983 for Chokh
National Film Award for Best Non-Feature Film at the 32nd National Film Awards in 1984 for Music of Satyajit Ray.

See also
Satarupa Sanyal

References

External links
Calcuttaweb Utpalendu Chakrabarty

On The Music of Satyajit Ray
On Chokh
On Debshishu

1948 births
Living people
Bengali writers
Bengali film directors
Indian male screenwriters
Indian documentary filmmakers
Scottish Church College alumni
University of Calcutta alumni
Best Director National Film Award winners
Film directors from Kolkata
20th-century Indian film directors
21st-century Indian film directors
Indian television directors
Screenwriters from Kolkata
20th-century Indian dramatists and playwrights
20th-century Indian male writers
Director whose film won the Best Debut Feature Film National Film Award
Directors who won the Best Feature Film National Film Award